is a 2014 Japanese drama film directed by Ryūichi Hiroki, starring Shota Sometani and Atsuko Maeda. It was selected to be screened in the Contemporary World Cinema section at the 2014 Toronto International Film Festival.

Plot
Having lost his job at a five-star hotel, Toru (Shota Sometani) is now a manager of a love hotel in the titular district of Kabukicho in Tokyo. Toru's girlfriend, Saya (Atsuko Maeda) is an aspiring singer. Saya doesn't know that Toru manages a love hotel. She ends up being a client there one night, where Toru discovers that she has agreed to sleep with a music executive so she can get a record deal.

Cast
 Shota Sometani as Toru Takahashi
 Atsuko Maeda as Saya Iijima
 Lee Na-ra as Hena
 Roy (Son Il-kwon) as Chong-su
 Kaho Minami as Satomi Suzuki
 Yutaka Matsushige as Yasuo Ikezawa
 Nao Ōmori as Kazuki Takenaka
 Jun Murakami as Kagehisa Amemiya
 Tomorowo Taguchi as Masashi Kubota
 Shugo Oshinari as Masaya Hayase
 Miwako Wagatsuma as Hinako Fukumoto
 Aoba Kawai as Rikako Fujita
 Tom Miyazaki as Ryuhei Shinjo
 Asuka Hinoi as Miyu Takahashi

Reception
Don Brown of Asahi Shimbun called it "one of Hiroki's most purely entertaining and satisfying films to date".

References

External links
  
 

2014 films
2014 drama films
Japanese drama films
2010s Japanese-language films
Films directed by Ryūichi Hiroki
Films set in hotels
2010s Japanese films